This is a list of fellows of the Royal Society elected in 1710.

Fellows
 Joshua Barnes (1654–1712)
 Vendramino Bianchi (1667–1738)
 Owen Brigstocke (1679–1746)
 Alexander Geekie (d. 1727)
 John Machin (d. 1751)
 Giovanni Poleni (1683–1761)
 Joseph Tanner (d. 1724)
 Christian, Freiherr von Wolff (1679–1754)

References

1710
1710 in science
1710 in England